Santhipuram is a locality in Visakhapatnam of Andhra Pradesh, India. It is in the Central part of the city.

About
This area is besides of Dwaraka Nagar so its all so commercial and residential area and connected will with all parts of the city.

References

Neighbourhoods in Visakhapatnam
Shopping districts and streets in India